Allston D.I.Y. Festival (commonly known as Allston DIY Fest or DIY Fest) is an annual community event in Allston, Massachusetts which takes place during one Saturday each July. Founded in 2010, it was promoted as a free, all-ages, sober festival celebrating do-it-yourself culture.  Founded on a punk, anarchist & anti-capitalist ethos, the festival discouraged the use of money and was organized non-hierarchically in a series of open meetings.

The festival showcased many emerging music acts in the area. Notable artists include: Fat History Month, Mornin' Old Sport, Doomstar!, Arvid Noe, The Rodeo Church, Chris North, and Melodeego. Featuring two stages, one acoustic and one electric, the festival also included skillshares, workshops, artists, and a free market.

The event takes place in Ringer Park, close to the Allston Street MBTA station.

Notes

External links
Allston DIY Fest official website

Punk rock genres
Rock festivals in the United States